HM Prison Full Sutton is a Category A and B men's prison in the village of Full Sutton, near Pocklington in the East Riding of Yorkshire, England. Full Sutton is operated by His Majesty's Prison Service, and held some 596 inmates, as of September 2018. The prison's primary function is to hold, in conditions of high security, some of the most difficult and dangerous criminals in the country.

The prison also has a unit known as the Close Supervision Centre, which is referred to as a "prison inside a prison". This is used to house prisoners who are a high risk to the public and national security. HMP Full Sutton will not normally accept prisoners who have been sentenced to less than four years, or who have less than twelve months left to serve.

History
Full Sutton Prison opened in 1987, as a purpose-built maximum security prison for men. Over the years, it has held some of the most difficult, violent and dangerous criminals in the country. The Home Office ordered an inquiry into Full Sutton in March 2000, after evidence emerged of racism among prison officers at the jail. 

The evidence centred on a log of an Asian inmate's phone conversations kept by two prison officers. The prison was criticised again in January 2003, when it emerged that inmates at Full Sutton were being paid as an incentive to learn to read and write. Payments of £1 to £3 were being made to prisoners on successful completion of literacy and numeracy courses at the jail.

On 4 September 2005 77-year old multiple murderer Sidney Noble, known as "Doctor Death", was taken hostage in his cell by fellow inmate Ian Magowan. He was tied to a chair, beaten, cut and suffered asphyxia having reportedly had his chest crushed. He died two weeks later having never regained consciousness. Magowan received a life sentence with a minimum tariff of 16 years. 

A report by the Chief Inspector of Prisons in December 2005 stated that gangs inside the prison were arranging "fight clubs" to pay off debts. The level of bullying and violence was so great that many wings were unsafe. There was evidence that gangs who had been operating on the streets continued to function inside the prison using intimidation. Security concerns had led to prisoners being denied access to outside sports.

In February 2006, the Independent Monitoring Board criticised Full Sutton for high levels of drug use amongst prisoners. The board stated that illegal drugs were an "insidious disease" inside the prison.

In February 2011, the convicted murderer Colin Hatch, who was jailed for the murder of seven-year-old Sean Williams in January 1994, was murdered in the prison. The man responsible was Damien Fowkes, an inmate who also attacked fellow child-killer Ian Huntley, who survived.

On 26 May 2013, a prison officer was taken hostage. He and a female colleague were injured; other officers successfully dealt with the incident. 

In March 2017, it was announced that a new prison will be built adjacent to the current one. The existing prison was to stay open during the development.

Prisoner John Onyemaechi went on a rampage in August 2018, attacking staff and starting a fire. The incident caused damage costing £15,000, and led to the deployment of more than one hundred officers.

On 13 October 2019, Richard Huckle – one of Britain's most persistent convicted child sex offenders, serving twenty-two life sentences – was murdered in the prison.

The prison today
The healthcare centre at the prison has a six-bed ward, with an additional two safer cells and a crisis suite. The centre is staffed by a full-time medical officer. Full Sutton Prison provides a range of educational courses, from Basic Skills through to Open University degree courses. Employment and training is also available in various prison workshops including, textiles, contract services, Braille transcription, catering and industrial cleaning.

The prison's gym also provides physical education with recognised qualifications, as well as recreational gym. There is a visitors' centre, with facilities including a baby-changing area, a children's play area and refreshment machines.

Plans were approved to build a 1,440 inmate "mega prison" at Full Sutton in September 2019, by East Riding of Yorkshire Council. More than 2,800 objections to it were lodged, including from police.

Notable inmates

Former inmates

 Jeremy Bamber
 Charles Bronson
 Dale Cregan
 Freddie Foreman
 Barry Horne
 Richard Huckle
 Dennis Nilsen
 Donald Neilson
 Sean O'Callaghan
 Curtis "Cocky" Warren

Current inmates
 John Cannan
 Steven Grieveson
 Omar Khyam
David Mulcahy
Darren Osborne
Danilo Restivo

References

External links
 Ministry of Justice pages on Full Sutton
 HMP Full Sutton – HM Inspectorate of Prisons Reports

Full
Full Sutton
1987 establishments in England
Full Sutton
Dispersal prisons